The Hawaiian Mission Academy (HMA) is a private coeducational day and boarding school in Honolulu, Hawaii. HMA is the only Academy that provides international dormitory housing on the island. It is a part of the Seventh-day Adventist education system, the world's second largest Christian school system.

History
Educational work of the Seventh-day Adventist Church in the Hawaiian Islands started in 1895 with a boarding school for boys, under the leadership of H. H. Brand. This school was named the Anglo-Chinese Academy in 1897 when Professor and Mrs. W. E. Howell came to Honolulu to head it.

To accommodate expanding enrollment, several changes in location were made until Bethel Grammar, as it was known then, located on Keeaumoku Street, added secondary grades. Increased enrollment again called forlarger quarters. In 1920 several properties on Makiki Street became the site of a combined elementary and secondary school designed to accommodate all Hawaiian Seventh-day Adventists mission schools, adopting the name Hawaiian Mission Academy.

Enrollment peaked  during World War II. In 1946, the estate of former Princess Abigail Campbell Kawānanakoa property on Pensacola Street, Royal Hawaiian land, became available as a site for a new secondary school. Construction began in summer 1949, and the secondary school and its administrative offices were moved to the campus in December, 1949. The elementary school remained at the Makiki Street campus.

Overview

Hawaiian Mission Academy is located 1438 Pensacola Street, in Honolulu, Hawaii on the island of Oahu. It has grades 9-12 and continues its affiliation with the Seventh-day Adventist Church. It is a coeducational college preparatory private school with an average of 135 students and 14 faculty.

Activities
HMA offers three sports:  basketball, volleyball, and golf.
HMA has an active Rotary Interact club.

The Senior class goes to California for 10 days to visit Pacific Union College in Napa County, La Sierra University in Riverside, and Loma Linda University School of Medicine in San Bernardino County. The seniors also visit Disneyland, SeaWorld, and other places during their trip. HMA students go to Camp Erdman in Mokuleia, Hawaii. Hawaiian Mission Academy sets aside a fall week of prayer, student week of prayer (the week of Camp Erdman), and a spring week of prayer for spiritual reflection. A special chapel is held every day of the week.

Spiritual aspects
All students take religion classes each year that they are enrolled. These classes cover topics in biblical history and Christian and denominational doctrines. Instructors in other disciplines also begin each class period with prayer or a short devotional thought, many which encourage student input. Weekly, the entire student body gathers together in the auditorium for an hour-long chapel service.
Outside the classrooms there is year-round spiritually oriented programming that relies on student involvement.

Notable alumni

Fernando Chui – Chief Executive of Macau
Eun Ji-won – South Korean actor and singer, leader of SECHSKIES
Kang Sung-hoon - South Korean actor and singer, member of SECHSKIES
Kangnam – South Korean-Japanese singer, member of South Korean hip hop quartet M.I.B
David Pendleton – politician, former member of the Hawaii House of Representatives
Mary Kawena Pukui – musician, hula dancer and educator
John Waihe’e – politician, former Governor of Hawaii (his wife Lynne Waihee is also an alumnus)

See also

 List of Seventh-day Adventist secondary schools
 Seventh-day Adventist education

References

External links
 
 
 Hawaiian Mission Academy , Private schools report, 2005, 2 April 2009
 Hawaiian Mission Academy, School Tree, 2 April 2009
 School Overview, Peterson’s, 2 April 2009
   Hawaiian Mission Academy, Private School Review, 2 April 2009
 

Educational institutions established in 1920
Adventist secondary schools in the United States
Private K-12 schools in Honolulu
Preparatory schools in Hawaii
1920 establishments in Hawaii